The Country Gentlemen is a compilation album by the progressive bluegrass band Country Gentlemen, recorded and released in 1973.

Track listing
Traveling Kind (Steve Young)
Don Quixote (Gordon Lightfoot)
One Morning in May
Casey's Last Ride (Kris Kristofferson)
The Leaves That Are Green (Paul Simon)
Paradise (John Prine)
House of the Rising Sun 
Catfish John (Bob McDill, Allen Reynolds)
Mother of a Miner's Son (Gordon Lightfoot)
Bringing Mary Home (John Duffey, Larry Kingston, Chaw Mank)
Souvenirs (John Prine)
The City of New Orleans (Steve Goodman)

Personnel
 Charlie Waller - guitar, vocals
 Doyle Lawson - mandolin, guitar, vocals
 Ricky Skaggs - fiddle, guitar, vocals guitar, and vocals 
  Bill Yates - bass and vocals 
  Jerry Douglas - dobro
  Mike Auldridge - dobro
  Bill Emerson - Banjo 
  James Bailey - banjo
  Al Rogers - drums

References

 http://charliewaller.net/

External links
 http://charliewaller.net/

1973 albums
Vanguard Records albums
The Country Gentlemen albums